Break In At Three Kilometer Island is a 1981 role-playing game adventure for Villains and Vigilantes published by Judges Guild.

Plot summary
Break In At Three Kilometer Island is an adventure involving a break in by four super-powered villains, known as the Four Fiends, at the nuclear power plant at Three Kilometer Island.

Reception
William A. Barton reviewed Break In At Three Kilometer Island in The Space Gamer No. 44. Barton commented that "Break In At Three Kilometer Island, while not perfect, still should provide V&Vers with enough in the way of adventure – especially with GM elaborations – to make it well worth the price."

References

Judges Guild publications
Role-playing game supplements introduced in 1981
Villains and Vigilantes adventures